The Liberals of Andorra (LA) is a conservative-liberal political party in Andorra. It is a member of the Liberal International and the Alliance of Liberals and Democrats for Europe.

History

The party was established as the Liberal Union in 1992 by Marc Forné Molné. In the 1993 elections it received 22% of the vote and won five seats, making it the second largest party in the General Council. Although the party was in opposition after Òscar Ribas Reig formed a progressive coalition government, Ribas was forced out of office after losing a vote of no confidence and Forné became Prime Minister on 7 December 1994.

After two votes of no confidence, Forné called early elections in 1997. In the run-up to the elections the Union formed alliances with several local parties, including the Liberal Union–Liberal Group of Encamp, the Liberal Opinion Group (GOL), Unity and Renewal (UiR) and the Lauredian Union (UL), with the local parties contesting only at the parish level. The Union won 16 seats of which GOL took four, UL two and the UiR two, with Forné remaining Prime Minister.

Shortly before the 2001 elections the party was renamed the Liberal Party of Andorra It won 46.1% of the popular vote and 15 seats, with Forné again remaining Prime Minister. In the 2005 elections the party lost another seat, but was still able to form a government, this time led by Albert Pintat. Pintat resigned the leadership, which passed to Joan Gabriel, before the 2009 elections.

In the elections the party was part of the Reformist Coalition alongside the Lauredian Union, Century 21, and two other political parties. The Coalition won 11 seats, whilst the Social Democrats won 14 seats and gained control of the government.

In the run up to the 2011 parliamentary election, the Liberal Party and the other members of the Reformist Coalition gave support to the Democrats for Andorra (DA). The new party chose Antoni Martí as leader and won the election on 3 April 2011 a landslide with 20 of the General Council's 28 seats.

Half way through the first term in office of Democrats for Andorra, a group of party activists started to actively work in order to run again separately in the 2015 elections. They presented their new name, Liberals of Andorra, and they announced their intention to stand candidates in the next parliamentary election.

In the 2015 parliamentary election held on 1 March 2015, the Liberal Party received 27.7% of the vote and 8 seats in the General Council.

Election results

General Council elections

Local elections

Notable members 
Marc Forné Molné
Juli Minoves
Jordi Gallardo
Ferran Costa Marimon
Judith Pallarés i Cortés

See also
Liberalism
Contributions to liberal theory
Liberalism worldwide
List of liberal parties
Liberal democracy

References

External links
Official website

Liberal International
Liberal parties in Andorra
Political parties in Andorra
Political parties established in 1992
Alliance of Liberals and Democrats for Europe Party member parties
1992 establishments in Andorra